Billy Joe Anderson (July 20, 1925 – February 20, 2013) was an American football player and coach.  He served as the head football coach at Howard Payne University from 1988 to 1991, compiling a record of 24–18.  Anderson was born in Erath County, Texas, on July 20, 1925.  During World War II he trained as B-29 tail gunner in the United States Army Air Forces, but did not serve overseas.  After the war, he attended Pepperdine University, where he played college football from 1947 to 1949 before graduating in 1950.  He then returned to his home state of Texas and coached football at a number of high schools. He later coached at Abilene Christian University, West Texas State University—now West Texas A&M University, Cisco College, and Tarleton State University. Anderson died on February 20, 2013, in Brownwood, Texas.

Head coaching record

References

1925 births
2013 deaths
Abilene Christian Wildcats football coaches
Howard Payne Yellow Jackets football coaches
Pepperdine Waves football players
Tarleton State Texans football coaches
West Texas A&M Buffaloes football coaches
Cisco Wranglers football coaches
United States Army Air Forces personnel of World War II
People from Erath County, Texas
Players of American football from Texas
United States Army Air Forces soldiers